Frank L. Fraser (September 29, 1854 – July 29, 1935) was an American lawyer and politician.

Born in Sacramento, California, Fraser moved to Wisconsin in 1860 and grew up in the town of East Troy, Walworth County, Wisconsin. He went to the Rochester Academy and the Whitewater Normal School. Fraser studied law in Racine, Wisconsin and was admitted to the Wisconsin bar in 1876. Fraser lived in Lake Beulah, Wisconsin and was also a farmer. He served on the Walworth County Board of Supervisors and was chairman of the East Troy Town Board. Fraser also served on the school board and was the board treasurer. Fraser was the postmaster for Lake Beulah. In 1895, Fraser served in the Wisconsin State Assembly and was a Republican. Fraser died at his home in East Troy, Wisconsin.

Notes

1854 births
1935 deaths
Politicians from Sacramento, California
People from East Troy, Wisconsin
University of Wisconsin–Whitewater alumni
Farmers from Wisconsin
Wisconsin lawyers
Mayors of places in Wisconsin
County supervisors in Wisconsin
School board members in Wisconsin
Republican Party members of the Wisconsin State Assembly